Mo Yongqing (born October 1952) is a Communist Party of China (CPC) politician. Han Chinese, he is a native of Hepu, Guangxi. He began working in August 1971 and joined the CPC in June 1972. He graduated from the Correspondence Institute of the Party School of the CPC Central Committee as a Research Associate. Later, he served as vice Director of the Standing Committee of the People's Congress of Guangxi Zhuang Autonomous Region.

Early work
Mo was a teacher in the early 1970s and then the Deputy Secretary of the Committee of the Communist Youth League of Hepu County. From November 1974 to October 1985, he worked in the Committee of the Communist Youth League of the Guangxi Zhuang Autonomous Region.

Career in politics
 October 1985 – January 1991: A secretary in the office of the Committee of the Communist party of Guangxi Zhuang Autonomous Region.
 January 1991 – August 1995: Secretary-General of the Nanning Municipal Committee of CPC.
 August – December 1995: Deputy Secretary of the Nanning Municipal Committee of CPC.
 December 1995 to February 2002: Deputy Secretary of the Disciplinary Commission of the Communist Party of Guangxi.
 April 1998 to February 2002: Director of supervision Department of the Government of Guangxi.
 February to October 2002: Deputy Secretary of the Guilin Municipal Committee of CPC and the Mayor of Guilin.
 October 2002 to April 2007: Secretary of the Guilin Municipal Committee of CPC.
 November 2006 to April 2007: Director of the Standing Committee of the People's Congress of Guilin.
 April 2007 to January 2008: Deputy Secretary of the People's Procuratorate of Guangxi, and then the Vice Director.
 January 2008 to present: Deputy director of the Eleventh Standing Committee of the People's Congress of Guangxi Zhuang Autonomous Region.

References

External links
 
 http://www.hudong.com/wiki/%e8%8e%ab%e6%b0%b8%e6%b8%85

Living people
Chinese communists
1952 births
People's Republic of China politicians from Guangxi